Zbigniew Marcinkowski (born 6 December 1949) is a former international speedway rider from Poland.

Speedway career 
Marcinkowski won a bronze medal during the Speedway World Pairs Championship in the 1973 Speedway World Pairs Championship.

World Final appearances

World Pairs Championship
 1972 –  Borås (with Wiktor Jastrzębski) – 5th – 15pts (13)
 1973 -  Borås (with Zenon Plech) - 3rd - 21pts (7)

References 

1949 births
Living people
Polish speedway riders
People from Zielona Góra